Lancini's robber frog (Pristimantis lancinii) is a species of frog in the family Strabomantidae. It is endemic to Venezuela.
Its natural habitat is tropical high-altitude grassland.
It is threatened by habitat loss.

References

External links
ARKive Images of Life on Earth: Lancini's Robber Frog
Craugastoridae - Neotropical Frogs: It includes the Lancini's Robber Frog
It Venezuela Endemic Amphibians Checklist: includes the Lancini's Robber Frog

lancinii
Amphibians of the Andes
Amphibians of Venezuela
Endemic fauna of Venezuela
Taxonomy articles created by Polbot